Francis Stephenson (born ) is an English former professional rugby league footballer who played in the 1990s and 2000s, and was the Operations Director at the Wakefield Trinity Wildcats.

He retired from playing during the 2007 close season, after playing in the Hull Kingston Rovers promotion season in National League One.

On signing in late 2005 Rovers made what they called a sensational swoop when the signed Stephenson from London Broncos a Super League star & club captain Yorkshire man Francis Stephenson put pen to paper on a two-year deal with the Hull Kingston Rovers. Francis nicknamed the colonel is a natural leader and has a presence on the pitch in the way he works with the team and in the changing rooms too.

Francis played his early rugby at Dewsbury Moor, and impressed enough to represent England schools in 1992. His most memorable career moment came at Wakefield Trinity (Heritage № 1058), when he scored the match-winning try in the 1998 NFP Grand Final, a try that ultimately took Wakefield Trinity into Super League.

Francis enjoyed two exceptional seasons in Super League, which resulted in selection for the England World Cup squad in 2000. A transfer to Wigan Warriors on the back of these fine performances followed but his period at the JJB was hindered by injury problems.
A move to London Broncos came in 2002 and Stephenson soon established himself as a prominent member of the Broncos pack.

Soon after retiring he took up the role of general manager at Wakefield Trinity Wildcats, following the departure of the previous Chief Executive.

Within months of this appointment, he was also instated as Team Manager of the England U18s team on their 2008 tour of Australia.

First Division Grand Final appearances
Francis Stephenson played left-, i.e. number 8, and scored the match winning try in Wakefield Trinity's 24–22 victory over Featherstone Rovers in the 1998 First Division Grand Final at McAlpine Stadium, Huddersfield on 26 September 1998.

Financial Crisis at Wakefield Trinity Wildcats
In 2000, at the height of a financial crisis at Wakefield Trinity Wildcats, the contracts of all players aged over 24 were terminated during September 2000. The players affected were; Andy Fisher, Bobbie Goulding, Warren Jowitt, Tony Kemp (player-coach), Steve McNamara, Francis Maloney, Martin Masella, Steve Prescott, Bright Sodje, Francis Stephenson, and Glen Tomlinson.

Genealogical Information
Francis Stephenson is the son of the rugby league footballer who played in the 1960s, 1970s and 1980s, and coached in the 1980s and 1990s; Nigel Stephenson, but he is not a relative of Nigel Stephenson's fellow Dewsbury 1973 Rugby Football League Championship winner, the rugby league footballer who played in the 1960s and 1970s, and coached in the 1970s, and rugby league commentator; Mike "Stevo" Stephenson.

References

External links
Profile at hullkrforum.com
(archived by web.archive.org) Francis Stephenson interview at wakefieldwildcats.co.uk
Wigan snap up prop Stephenson
Three Charities benefit from Rugby League Tri athletes
Great Britain Rugby All Stars Squad
2001 Super League Team-by-team guide

1976 births
Living people
England national rugby league team players
English rugby league coaches
English rugby league players
Hull Kingston Rovers players
London Broncos players
Rugby league players from Dewsbury
Rugby league props
Wakefield Trinity players
Wigan Warriors players